Feelings is a 1968 Lithuanian drama film directed by Algirdas Dausa and Almantas Grikevičius.

Cast 
 Regimantas Adomaitis - Kasparas
 Juozas Budraitis - Andrius
  - Agne
  - Policeman Vaitkiavicius
  - Morta / Iane
 Algimantas Masiulis - German Soldier Ferdinand
  - Philologist
 Vytautas Paukštė - Teacher
  - Vytautas, Iane's Husband
  - Police Commander

References

External links 

1968 drama films
1968 films
Soviet-era Lithuanian films
Soviet drama films
Lithuanian drama films